Su Weizhen (16 July 1954) is a Taiwanese writer, educator and editor.

She was born in Panyu, Taiwan and studied at the Political Staff College in Taiwan and the Chinese University of Hong Kong. Su served in the army and afterwards worked at a radio station. Later, she taught literature at the Chinese Culture University and was editor for the literary supplement of the United Daily News.

In 2011, she participated in the International Writing Program Fall Residency at the University of Iowa in Iowa City, IA.

She married Zhang Demo, who has since died.

She has received the:
 1980 Daily News short story award
 1981 Daily News novelette award
 1994 China Times novel award

Selected works 
 Hongyan yi lao (The beauty has aged), story (1980)
 Pei ta yiduan (Keep him company for a while), story (1983)
 Sui yue di sheng yin (The sound of time) (1984)
 Chenmo zhi dao (Silent island) (1994)
 Fengbi de daoyu (Island in isolation) (1996)
 Moshu shike (Magic moment) (2002)

References 

1954 births
Living people
Taiwanese women novelists
Writers from Guangzhou
Chinese women writers
International Writing Program alumni
Taiwanese people from Guangdong